Candelario Garcia, Jr. (February 26, 1944 – January 10, 2013) was a United States Army veteran of the Vietnam War, and a recipient of the Medal of Honor.

Biography
Garcia was born in Corsicana, Texas on February 26, 1944, of Mexican descent.

He enlisted in the U.S. Army on May 28, 1963, and his actions on December 8, 1968 while serving in Vietnam caused him to receive the Medal of Honor, posthumously, in 2014. Garcia died on January 10, 2013, aged 68, in his native Corsicana.

Medal of Honor
Garcia distinguished himself on December 8, 1968, as a team leader during a reconnaissance-in-force mission near Lai Khê, Vietnam during Operation Toan Thang II. Garcia destroyed two enemy machine-gun positions in an attempt to aid casualties that were in the open and under fire, then rejoining his company in a successful assault on the remaining enemy positions. Garcia was originally awarded a Distinguished Service Cross on 4 April 1969 for this action. The award was rescinded on 18 March 2014 under Permanent Order 077-34.

He received the Medal of Honor, posthumously, from President Barack Obama in a March 18, 2014 White House ceremony. As Garcia had been a former "Big Red One" (1st Infantry Division) soldier, the 1st Infantry Division's Command Sgt. Maj. Michael A. Grinston received the medal on behalf of Garcia and his surviving family members.   Garcia's surviving Family members had asked the division to represent him in the White House ceremony and the Pentagon ceremony inducting him into the Pentagon Hall of Heroes.

The award came through the Defense Authorization Act which called for a review of Jewish American and Hispanic American veterans from World War II, the Korean War and the Vietnam War to ensure that no prejudice was shown to those deserving the Medal of Honor.

Citation
'''

Other honors, awards and decorations
Besides the Medal of Honor, Garcia received the Silver Star, Bronze Star Medal, Purple Heart, Air Medal, Army Commendation Medal with "V" Device and one Bronze Oak Leaf Cluster, Army Good Conduct Medal, National Defense Service Medal, Vietnam Service Medal with two Silver Service Stars and one Bronze Service Star, Meritorious Unit Commendation, Combat Infantryman Badge, Expert Marksmanship Badge with Rifle, Republic of Vietnam Gallantry Cross with Silver Star, Republic of Vietnam Campaign Medal with "60" Device, Republic of Vietnam Gallantry Cross Unit Citations with Palm Device and Republic of Vietnam Civil Actions Honor Medal Unit Citation, First Class

See also
 List of Medal of Honor recipients for the Vietnam War

References

External links
 

1944 births
2013 deaths
United States Army personnel of the Vietnam War
American people of Mexican descent
People from Corsicana, Texas
Recipients of the Air Medal
Recipients of the Silver Star
United States Army Medal of Honor recipients
United States Army soldiers
Vietnam War recipients of the Medal of Honor